The following Confederate Army units and commanders fought in the Siege of Suffolk of the American Civil War. The Union order of battle is listed separately.

Abbreviations used

Military rank
 LTG = Lieutenant General
 MG = Major General
 BG = Brigadier General
 Col = Colonel
 Ltc = Lieutenant Colonel
 Maj = Major
 Cpt = Captain
 Lt = Lieutenant

Other
 (w) = wounded
 (mw) = mortally wounded
 (k) = killed in action
 (c) = captured

Department of North Carolina and Southern Virginia
LTG James Longstreet, Commanding

Infantry and Artillery

Cavalry

Notes

References
 Cormier, Steven A., The Siege of Suffolk: The Forgotten Campaign, April 11 – May 4, 1863, H. E. Howard, 1989, .

American Civil War orders of battle